Mordaunt Cohen  (6 August 1916 – 16 March 2019) was a British soldier and solicitor.

Early life
Mordaunt Cohen was born in Sunderland, England on 6 August 1916 and was educated at the Bede Collegiate School. He qualified as a solicitor at twenty-one and set up his own practice the following year.

War Service
Cohen volunteered for service in 1940 and was commissioned into the Royal Artillery as a 2nd Lt (212456), on 4 October 1941, where he served in the Anti-Aircraft (AA) branch. His unit, 251 Heavy Anti-Aircraft (HAA) Battery, was posted to West Africa Command. There he commanded Nigerian troops, including Muslims, of the West African Artillery (WAA). In West Africa, he learned Hausa - the lingua franca for Nigerian troops - and trained his men for active service. In Burma, he led them in the fight against the Japanese. At the end of the war his service was recognised with the award of a Mention in Despatches.

After the war, Cohen transferred to the Territorial Army and continued his military service. In 1954, by now a Major, he received the Territorial Decoration. He retired as a Lieutenant-Colonel.

Career
On his demobilisation, Cohen re-established his legal practice. His core work was in industrial relations, representing trade union, but later he became a full-time chair of industrial tribunals. In 1969, he was involved in the foundation of Sunderland Polytechnic and became the first chairman of the Board of Governors, supporting the Rector Dr. Maurice Hutton. In 1992, the institution was, in turn, among the first polytechnics to gain university status.  Cohen was an Orthodox Jew. He was a member, and later chairman, of the Association of Jewish ex-Service Men. As a centenarian, he remained active in educating future generations about the Second World War, and in 2017 he was awarded an MBE for this work.

Family life
In 1953, Mordaunt married Myrella. The couple had two children. Mrs. Cohen was known professionally as: Her Honour Myrella Cohen, QC and was a distinguished figure in her own right. The Cohens were the first British couple to hold simultaneous, full-time judicial positions. Cohen was widowed in 2002 and died himself on 16 March 2019, at the age of 102.

Notes

References

1916 births
2019 deaths
British Army personnel of World War II
English centenarians
English Orthodox Jews
English solicitors
Men centenarians
Royal West African Frontier Force officers
Royal Artillery officers
20th-century English lawyers